Ishdorjiin Otgonbayar (born April 9, 1968 Ulaanbaatar, Mongolia) is a Mongolian football coach. He was coach of the Mongolia national football team from 2000 to January 2011.

External links 
 

Living people
Mongolian football managers
Mongolia national football team managers
1966 births
People from Ulaanbaatar